Jim Fusilli is (born July 17, 1953) is an American journalist, essayist and novelist.  He served as the rock-and-pop critic for The Wall Street Journal from 2009 to 2018, and contributed to NPR’s All Things Considered.  He has written nine novels and is also the author of the Pet Sounds entry in Bloomsbury Publishing’s 33 1/3 series.

Early life and education 
Vincent James Fusilli Jr. was born in Hoboken, New Jersey. He majored in English at St. Peter’s College (now Saint Peter’s University) where he was a critic for the student newspaper, the Pauw Wow.  While in college, Fusilli joined the Teamsters Local 560 as a clerk at Smith Transport, headquartered in Hoboken.

Writing career

Journalism 
After graduation in 1975, he served as an intern at The Jersey Journal, where he wrote a weekly column on popular music. He also contributed articles to The Record.

In 1982, Fusilli was hired by Dow Jones & Company, in its Corporate Relations department with responsibility for employee communications. Shortly thereafter, he began to contribute to the Journal’s new Leisure and Arts page, whose editor was Raymond Sokolov.  His essay A Wall Street Rocker was published in The New York Times Magazine in 1986.

While continuing his occasional contributions to the Journal, Fusilli left Dow Jones and joined Sanofi, Inc., the U.S. holding company for the Paris-based Sanofi S.A.. During his 12 years with the company, Fusilli became Vice President, Corporate Communications, a position in which he frequently traveled to Paris, accompanied the chairman and CEO Jean-François Dehecq, and worked with Oscar de la Renta, Yves Saint Laurent and other fashion luminaries whose fragrances were marketed by Sanofi. He left the company in 2001.

In 2009, Fusilli was appointed The Wall Street Journal’s rock-and-pop critic, the first in its history, and wrote a weekly column for its Arts section until 2018.

Novels 
The first in a mystery series featuring the private detective Terry Orr and his daughter Bella, Closing Time was published by Penguin Putnam on September 10, 2001. Set in New York’s Tribeca district, it was the last novel set in the city prior to the September 11 terrorist attacks. Subsequently, the sequel, A Well-Known Secret, was the first novel set in New York following the attacks; it addresses the impact on the city, the Tribeca neighborhood and the psyche of the reoccurring characters. Two more novels in the series came thereafter:  Tribeca Blues, published in 2003, and Hard, Hard City, published in 2004. Hard, Hard City was named the Novel of the Year by Mystery Ink Magazine.  The first three books in the series were subsequently reissued by Open Road Integrated Media.

Fusilli’s novels The Road to Nowhere (2012) and Billboard Man (2013) were published by Amazon Publishing’s Thomas & Mercer imprint.

Audiobooks 
Prior to its acquisition by Amazon, Audible had acquired Narrows Gate, which it published as its first mainstream literary novel. Amazon Publishing issued the paperback original version of Narrows Gate. Narrows Gate was nominated for the Sue Feder Historical Mystery Award in 2012. Its sequel, The Mayor of Polk Street, was published as an Audible Original in 2019 and by Open Road Media in 2022.  Actor and film director Edoardo Ballerini narrated Narrows Gate and The Mayor of Polk Street.

Young adult 
Fusilli's novel for young adults, Marley Z and the Bloodstained Violin, was published by Dutton Juvenile in 2008.

Short stories 
Fusilli's short stories have appeared in magazines including Alfred Hitchcock’s Mystery Magazine, and anthologies edited by Lee Child, Dennis Lehane, Laura Lippman, George Pelecanos and others. He edited and contributed to the anthologies The Chopin Manuscript, The Copper Bracelet and Crime Plus Music: Twenty Stories of Music-Themed Noir. His short story Chellini’s Solution was included in an edition of the Best American Mystery Stories and his Digby, Attorney at Law was nominated for the Edgar and Macavity awards in 2010, presented by the Mystery Writers of America and Mystery Readers International, respectively.

Nonfiction 
In 2005, Fusilli's writing on Pet Sounds was published as part of the 33 1/3 series. It was translated for a Japanese language edition by Haruki Murakami.

Personal life 
Fusilli and his wife Diane, an international communications executive, reside in Washington D.C.

References

External links 
 Official website

The Wall Street Journal people
American journalists for national newspapers
Dow Jones & Company people
Alumni
Fiction
Crime fiction
Crime fiction
People from Hoboken
1953 births
Living people